William Steven Searcy (born June 4, 1964) is an American former professional baseball pitcher who played in Major League Baseball (MLB) for the Detroit Tigers and Philadelphia Phillies.

Early years
Though he is naturally right handed, Searcy was born with osteomyelitis in his right shoulder. Thus, he does some tasks with his left hand, including throwing a baseball.

Hailing from Knoxville, Tennessee, Searcy attended the University of Tennessee. With a team leading 2.45 earned run average (ERA) and 95.1 innings pitched, he led the Tennessee Volunteers baseball team to a second-place finish in the 1984 Southeastern Conference baseball tournament. Following one more season playing college ball, he was drafted by the Detroit Tigers in the third round of the 1985 Major League Baseball Draft.

In , Searcy went 11–6 with a 3.30 ERA and 139 strikeouts over 27 starts for the Glens Falls Tigers in their inaugural season. Injuries aside, however, the Tigers were reluctant to part with their young pitcher at the 1987 trade deadline when they were in need of a veteran arm for the major league club's playoff drive. Instead, they opted to ship fellow minor league pitcher John Smoltz to the Atlanta Braves for Doyle Alexander.

Detroit Tigers
Searcy made his major league debut on August 29, against the Chicago White Sox at old Comiskey Park. Starting, he pitched seven plus strong innings, but was tagged with the loss. In his second and final start of the season, Searcy faced six Milwaukee Brewers batters, and gave up three runs (2 earned) while only retiring one batter before being lifted.

After eighteen rehab starts for the Lakeland Tigers and Toledo, Searcy made his first major league appearance of the  season on August 20, starting against the New York Yankees. After four relief appearances, Searcy made a second start against the Minnesota Twins on September 17 to earn his first major league win.

He split the  season between Toledo and Detroit. After winning his first start with the Tigers, his record fell to 1–5 with a 5.43 ERA before he would earn a second win.

Searcy won a spot in Detroit's starting rotation out of Spring training . After failing to get out of the third inning in three of his five starts, Searcy was demoted to the bullpen. Searcy was still unable to find his groove as a reliever, and was demoted to the minors. With this being his seventh minor league season, he was granted free agency.

Philadelphia Phillies
After initially talking with the Los Angeles Dodgers, Searcy signed with the Philadelphia Phillies on July 15, 1991. Coincidentally, his first appearance for the Phillies came against the Dodgers at Veterans Stadium. He entered the game in the fifth inning with the Phillies trailing 6–3, and allowed one earned run in two innings. The Phillies, meanwhile, scored four runs in the bottom of the fifth and another in the sixth to earn Searcy the win in his first National League appearance.

After ten appearances with no wins or losses and a 6.10 ERA, he was traded to the Dodgers for outfielder Stan Javier on July 2.

Searcy spent the rest of the  season assigned to the Dodgers' triple A Pacific Coast League affiliate, the Albuquerque Dukes. After the season, he signed a minor league deal with the Baltimore Orioles with a non-roster invitation to Spring training for the open fifth starter and long reliever spots for  season. Unable to land either position, he spent the season with the triple A Rochester Red Wings, where he went 2–1 with a 6.00 ERA in sixteen relief appearances.

References

External links

Sports Illustrated

1964 births
Living people
Major League Baseball pitchers
Baseball players from Knoxville, Tennessee
Detroit Tigers players
Philadelphia Phillies players
Albuquerque Dukes players
Rochester Red Wings players
Glens Falls Tigers players
Scranton/Wilkes-Barre Red Barons players
Bristol Tigers players
Toledo Mud Hens players
Lakeland Tigers players
Birmingham Barons players